Tochifuji Katsutake (born Haruo Kogure; June 8, 1946 – April 28, 2003) was a sumo wrestler from Kumagaya, Saitama, Japan. He made his professional debut in May 1961, and reached the top division in September 1968. Upon retirement from active competition he became an elder in the Japan Sumo Association under the name Yamawake. He coached at Kasugano-beya until 1990, when he joined Tamanoi-oyakata, who branched out to form Tamanoi-beya. He died on April 28, 2003, due to a myocardial infarction

Career record

See also
Glossary of sumo terms
List of past sumo wrestlers
List of sumo tournament second division champions

References

1946 births
Japanese sumo wrestlers
Sumo people from Saitama Prefecture
2003 deaths